Elizabeth Lawrence (September 6, 1922 – June 11, 2000) was an American actress, best known for her role as "Myra Murdock Sloane" in the soap opera All My Children from 1979–1991.

Life and career
Lawrence was born in Huntington, West Virginia and obtained a bachelor's degree in science and a master's degree in special education. She made her acting debut in 1947 off broadway in Skin of our Teeth and her Broadway debut in 1954 in The Rainmaker and would go on to act in several other theatrical productions.   She would also work on the Daytime Soap Operas The Road of Life, The Edge of Night, A World Apart, The Doctors, Guiding Light, and All My Children from 1979 to 1991 where she played Myra Murdock Sloane and earned three Daytime Emmy Award nominations in 1981, 1982 and 1985 for Outstanding Supporting Actress in a Drama Series. Her other notable acting work includes roles in the movies Four Friends, We're No Angels, Sleeping with the Enemy, The Butcher's Wife and The Crucible as well as guest starring roles on television series such as Law & Order, Oz and Third Watch. In the 1970s and 1980s she also worked as an auxiliary police officer in Manhattan, New York.

Death
Lawrence died of cancer on June 11, 2000 at age 77. M. Night Shymalan's Unbreakable was dedicated to her memory.

References

External links

 
 
 

1922 births
2000 deaths
Actresses from West Virginia
American film actresses
American soap opera actresses
Place of death missing
Actors from Huntington, West Virginia
American stage actresses
20th-century American actresses